t Haantje is a hamlet in the Dutch province of Overijssel. It is located in the municipality of Hardenberg, about 5 km north of the town of Hardenberg.

't Haantje is not a statistical entity, and the postal authorities have placed it under Lutten. It has about 25 houses.

References

Populated places in Overijssel
Hardenberg